The Province of Pennsylvania, also known as the Pennsylvania Colony, was a British North American colony founded by William Penn, who received the land through a grant from Charles II of England in 1681. The name Pennsylvania was derived from "Penn's Woods", referring to William's father Admiral Sir William Penn. 

The Province of Pennsylvania was one of the two major Restoration colonies. The proprietary colony's charter remained in the Penn family until they were later ousted following the American Revolution and the Commonwealth of Pennsylvania was established as one of the original thirteen states. The lower counties on Delaware, a separate colony within the Pennsylvania Province, broke away during the American Revolution and was established as the Delaware State and also became one of the original thirteen states.

The colony attracted Quakers, Germans, and Scot-Irish frontiersmen. The Lenape Indian tribe promoted peace with the Quakers. However, after William Penn and Tamanend, who both supported peaceful coexistence, died, wars eventually broke out. The Quakers demonized Lenape mythology even though the Quakers were strong proponents of religious freedom. 

Philadelphia, the capital of the Province of Pennsylvania, emerged as a major port and commercial city and central location for the thinking, writings, and planning that ultimately inspired the American Revolution. In the 18th century, Philadelphia emerged as the second-largest city in the British Empire, after London. Following the American Revolutionary War, Philadelphia served as the nation's capital until 1800, when a new capital city in Washington, D.C. was constructed at the direction of the young nation's Founding Fathers.

Government

The Province of Pennsylvania's colonial government was established in 1683, by William Penn's Frame of Government. Penn was appointed governor and a 72-member Provincial Council and larger General Assembly were responsible for governing the province. The General Assembly, also known as the Pennsylvania Provincial Assembly, was the largest and most representative branch of government but had limited power.

Succeeding Frames of Government were produced in 1683, 1696, and 1701. The fourth Frame, also known as the Charter of Privileges, remained in effect until the American Revolution. At the time, the Provincial Assembly was deemed too moderate by Amerian revolutionaries, who rejected the General Assembly's authority and held the First Continental Convention, which produced the Pennsylvania Constitution of 1776 for the newly-established commonwealth and created the new Pennsylvania General Assembly.

Penn was an English real estate entrepreneur, philosopher, Quaker, and founder of the Province of Pennsylvania. Penn was an advocate of democracy and religious freedom and was known for fostering peaceful and positive relations with the Lenape Indians through a number of treaties. Under Penn's direction, Philadelphia was planned and developed.

Counties
Despite having the land grant from King Charles II, Penn embarked on an effort to purchase the lands from Native Americans. The Lenape Indian tribe held much of the land near present-day Philadelphia, and they expected payment in exchange for a quitclaim to vacate the territory.  Penn and his representatives (Proprietors) negotiated a series of treaties with the Delaware and other tribes that had an interest in the land in his royal grant.

The initial treaties were conducted between 1682 and 1684, for tracts between New Jersey and the former Delaware Colony in present-day Delaware. The province was thus divided first into three counties, plus the three Lower counties on Delaware Bay. The easternmost, Bucks County, Philadelphia County and Chester County, the westernmost.

Lower counties

The lower counties on Delaware, a separate colony within the province, constituted the same three counties that constitute the present State of Delaware: New Castle, the northernmost, Sussex, the southernmost, and Kent, which fell between New Castle and Sussex County. Their borders remain unchanged to this day.

New Lands and New Counties
Several decades into the 18th century, additional treaties with the Native Americans were concluded. The colony's proprietors made treaties in 1718, 1732, 1737, 1749, 1754, and 1754 pushing the boundaries of the colony, which were still within the original royal grant, north and west. By the time the French and Indian War began in 1754, the Assembly had established the additional counties of Lancaster (1729), York (1749), Cumberland (1750), Berks (1752) and Northampton (1752).

After the American Revolutionary War concluded, an additional treaty was made in 1768, that abided by the limits of the Royal Proclamation of 1763. This proclamation line was not intended to be a permanent boundary between the colonists and Native American lands, but rather a temporary boundary that could be extended further west in an orderly manner but only by the royal government and not private individuals such as the Proprietors.  This effectively altered the original royal land grant to Penn. The next acquisitions by Pennsylvania were to take place as an independent commonwealth or state and no longer as a colony. The Assembly established additional counties from the land before the War for American Independence. These counties were Bedford (1771), Northumberland (1772) and Westmoreland (1773).

Religious freedom and prosperity
William Penn and his fellow Quakers heavily imprinted their religious beliefs and values on the early Pennsylvanian government. The Charter of Privileges extended religious freedom to all monotheists, and the government was initially open to all Christians. Until the French and Indian War, Pennsylvania had no military, few taxes, and no public debt. It also encouraged the rapid growth of Philadelphia into America's most important city and of the Pennsylvania Dutch Country hinterlands, where German (or "Deutsch") religions and political refugees prospered on the fertile soil and spirit of cultural creativeness. Among the first groups were the Mennonites, who founded Germantown in 1683; and the Amish, who established the Northkill Amish Settlement in 1740. 1751 was an auspicious year for the colony. Pennsylvania Hospital, the first hospital in the British American colonies, and The Academy and College of Philadelphia, the predecessor to the private University of Pennsylvania, both opened. Benjamin Franklin founded both of these institutions and Philadelphia's Union Fire Company fifteen years earlier in 1736. Likewise in 1751, the Pennsylvania State House ordered a new bell which would become known as the Liberty Bell for the new bell tower being built in the Pennsylvania State House in Philadelphia.

Indigenous relations

William Penn had mandated fair dealings with Native Americans in the United States. This led to significantly better relations with the local tribes, mainly the Lenape and Susquehanna, than most other colonies had. The Quakers had previously treated Indians with respect, bought land from them voluntarily, and had even representation of Indians and whites on juries. According to Voltaire, the Shackamaxon Treaty was "the only treaty between Indians and Christians that was never sworn to and that was never broken." The Quakers also refused to provide any assistance to New England's Indian wars.

In 1737, the Colony exchanged a great deal of its political goodwill with the native Lenape for more land. The colonial administrators claimed that they had a deed dating to the 1680s in which the Lenape-Delaware had promised to sell a portion of land beginning between the junction of the Delaware River and Lehigh River in present day Easton, Pennsylvania "as far west as a man could walk in a day and a half." This purchase has become known as the Walking Purchase. Although the document was most likely a forgery, the Lenape did not realize that. Provincial Secretary James Logan set in motion a plan that would grab as much land as they could get and hired the three fastest runners in the colony to run out the purchase on a trail that had been cleared by other members of the colony beforehand. The pace was so intense that only one runner completed the "walk," covering an astonishing . This netted the Penns  of land in what is now northeastern Pennsylvania, an area roughly equivalent to the size of the state of Rhode Island in the purchase. The area of the purchase covers all or part of what are now Pike, Monroe, Carbon, Schuylkill, Northampton, Lehigh, and Bucks counties. The Lenape tribe fought for the next 19 years to have the treaty annulled but to no avail. The Lenape-Delaware were forced into the Shamokin and Wyoming Valleys, which were overcrowded with other displaced tribes.

Limits on further settlement

As the colony grew, colonists and British military forces came into confrontation with natives in the state's Western half. Britain fought for control of the neighboring Ohio Country with France during the French and Indian War. Following the British victory, the territory was formally ceded to them in 1763, and became part of the British Empire.

With the French and Indian War over and Pontiac's War just beginning, the Royal Proclamation of 1763 banned colonization beyond the Appalachian Mountains to prevent settlers settling lands that Indians tribes were using. This proclamation impacted Pennsylvanians and Virginians the most, since they both had been racing towards the lands surrounding Fort Pitt in modern-day Pittsburgh.

Judiciary
The Supreme Court of Pennsylvania, consisting of the Chief Justice and at least one other judge, was founded by statute in 1722 (although dating back to 1684 as the Provincial Court) and sat in Philadelphia twice a year.
Chief Justices

Notable people
John Dickinson, Founding Father of the United States
Benjamin Franklin moved to Philadelphia at age 17 in 1723; he was Pennsylvania's most famous citizen during his later years. Among his accomplishments was founding in 1751 the Academy and College of Philadelphia, the predecessor to the private University of Pennsylvania. Franklin was also a strong advocate for a state militia, creating his own extra-legal militia when the state assembly would not during King George's War
Thomas McKean was born in New London, Pennsylvania. He was an officer in the Continental Army during the American Revolution, a signer of the Declaration of Independence, the second President of the U.S. Congress under the Articles of Confederation, Acting President of Delaware, and Chief Justice and Governor of Pennsylvania
Gouverneur Morris, one of the leading minds of the American Revolution, lived in New York City during most of the colonial period but moved to Philadelphia to work as a lawyer and merchant during the Revolution
Robert Morris moved to Philadelphia around 1749 at about age 14. He was known as the Financier of the Revolution because of his role in securing financial assistance for the American Colonial side in the Revolutionary War. In 1921, Robert Morris University was founded and named after him
John Morton was born in Ridley Township, Pennsylvania. He was a delegate to the Continental Congress and a signatory to the Continental Association and the United States Declaration of Independence
Timothy Murphy a Continental Army marksman
Thomas Paine emigrated to Philadelphia in 1774 at Benjamin Franklin's urging. His tract, Common Sense, published in 1776, was arguably the most famous and influential argument for the American Revolution. He was also the first to champion the phrase "United States of America" publicly
William Penn was the colony's founder and son of naval Admiral Sir William Penn
George Ross was born in New Castle, Delaware and moved to Philadelphia to practice law.  He was a delegate to the Continental Congress and a signatory to the Continental Association and the United States Declaration of Independence
Peggy Shippen was the daughter of prominent Philadelphia merchant Edward Shippen and wife of Benedict Arnold
Arthur St. Clair moved to Ligonier Valley, Pennsylvania in 1764. He served as a judge in colonial Pennsylvania, a general in the Continental Army, and a President under the Articles of Confederation
 Samuel Van Leer, (1747–1825) ironmaster and captain in the American Revolutionary War
 Anthony Wayne, American Revolutionary War general
James Wilson moved to Philadelphia in 1765 and became a lawyer. He signed the Declaration of Independence and wrote or worked on many of the most challenging compromises in the U.S. Constitution, including the Three-Fifths Compromise, which defined slaves as three-fifths of a person for purposes of census-taking, the number of members to be elected to U. S. House of Representatives, and government appropriations

See also
 Fort Augusta
 Fort Dupuy
 Great Wagon Road
 Independence Hall, originally the Pennsylvania State House.
 List of colonial governors of Pennsylvania
 Pennsylvania in the American Revolution
 Restoration colony
 Walking Purchase
 Welsh Tract

References

Citations

General sources 
 
 
 Lamberton, E. V., et al. “Colonial Libraries of Pennsylvania.” The Pennsylvania Magazine of History and Biography, vol. 42, no. 3, 1918, pp. 193–234. online
 Leonard, Joan de Lourdes. “Elections in Colonial Pennsylvania.” William and Mary Quarterly 11#3 1954, pp. 385–401. online
 
 Nash, Gary B. Quakers and Politics: Pennsylvania, 1681-1726 (Princeton UP, 1993)
 Smolenski, John. "Embodied politics: the Paxton uprising and the gendering of civic culture in colonial Pennsylvania." Early American Studies 14.2 (2016): 377-407 online.
 Smolenski, John. Friends and Strangers: The Making of a Creole Culture in Colonial Pennsylvania  (U of Pennsylvania Press, 2010. 
 
 Tully, Alan. Forming American Politics: Ideals, Interests, and Institutions in Colonial New York and Pennsylvania (JHU Press, 2019).

External links
 William Penn: Preface to the Frame of Government of Pennsylvania, 1682
 "Members and Districts by Session, 1682-1775", Wilkes University Election Statistics Project
 Pennsylvania General Assembly: Pennsylvania Constitution

 
1681 establishments in the British Empire
1776 disestablishments in the British Empire
Colonial United States (British)
English colonization of the Americas
Former British colonies and protectorates in the Americas
Former English colonies
Middle Colonies
States and territories established in 1681
Thirteen Colonies
William Penn